The Minister for Development Cooperation and Foreign Trade (formerly Minister for Foreign Trade and Development) is one of the 19 ministerial portfolios represented in the Finnish Government. The Minister for Development Cooperation and Foreign Trade is one of the Ministry for Foreign Affairs' three ministerial positions; the other two are the Minister for Foreign Affairs and the Minister for Nordic Cooperation. The incumbent Minister for Development Cooperation and Foreign Trade for the Marin Cabinet is Ville Skinnari of the Social Democratic Party.

References 

Lists of government ministers of Finland